Fritz Helmuth Ehmcke (1878–1965) was a German graphical designer, typographer and illustrator.

Born in Inowrocław, Prussia (now Poland), Ehmcke was educated as a lithographer in Berlin during 1893–1897. In 1900, he was a co-founder of Steglitzer Werkstatt.
From 1903, he taught at the Kunstgewerbeschule in Düsseldorf, from 1913 to 1938 in Munich, during 1920-1921 also in Zürich.
During 1946 to 1948, he was professor  at the Academy of Fine Arts, Munich.

He designed a number of typesets, notably Ehmcke-Antiqua and Ehmcke-Kursiv in 1909/10 (adopted for English-language typesetting by Stephenson Blake under the name Carlton).

Typesets

 Ehmcke Antiqua (1908 Flinsch)
 Ehmcke Kursiv (1910 Flinsch)
 Ehmcke Fraktur (1912 D. Stempel AG)
 Ehmcke Rustika (1914 D. Stempel AG)
 Ehmcke Schwabacher (1914 D. Stempel AG)
 Ehmcke Schwabacher halbfett (1915 D. Stempel AG)
 Ehmcke Fraktur halbfett (1917 D. Stempel AG)
 Ehmcke Mediaeval (1922 D. Stempel AG)
 Ehmcke Mediaeval kursiv (1923 D. Stempel AG)
 Ehmcke Mediaeval halbfett (1924 D. Stempel AG)
 Ehmcke Latein (1925 Ludwig & Mayer)
 Ehmcke-Latein halbfett (1925 Ludwig & Mayer)
 Ehmcke Brotschrift (1927 Rupprecht Presse)
 Ehmcke Elzevir (1927 L. Wagner)
 Ehmcke Elzevir kräftig (1930 L. Wagner)

Bibliography
 Amtliche Graphik. Hugo Bruckmann, München 1918. 
 Ehmcke-Kursiv (= Type und Ornament Heft XXXIX), Schriftgiesserei Flinsch, Frankfurt 1910.
 Ziele des Schriftunterrichts. Ein Beitrag zur modernen Schriftbewegung. Diederichs, Jena 1911, 2nd ed. 1929. 
 Ehmcke-Mediaeval und Mediaeval-Kursiv. Berlin 1925. 
 Die historische Entwicklung der abendlaendischen Schriftformen. Otto Maier, Ravensburg 1927.
 Persönliches und Sachliches. Gesammelte Aufsätze und Arbeiten aus 25 Jahren. Reckendorf, Berlin 1928.
 Kulturpolitik. Ein Bekenntnis und Programm zum Wiederaufbau deutscher Lebensform. Schauer, Frankfurt am Main 1947.
 Broschur und Schutzumschlag am deutschen Buch der neueren Zeit. Mainz 1951. 
 Geordnetes und Gültiges. Gesammelte Aufsätze und Arbeiten aus den letzten 25 Jahren. Beck, München 1955.
 Der Sonderbund, Auszug aus F. H. Ehmckes Lebenserinnerungen I, 1909-1911, in: Neusser Jahrbuch für Kunst, Kulturgeschichte und Heimatkunde 1985, S.5-25.
 Der Sonderbund, Auszug aus F. H. Ehmckes Lebenserinnerungen II, 1911-1912, in: Neusser Jahrbuch für Kunst, Kulturgeschichte und Heimatkunde 1986, S.5-25.

References 
 Thomas Kraft: Fritz Ehmcke (1878–1965). In: Thomas Kraft (ed.): Herrsching zur Zeit Christian Morgensterns. Bilder des kulturellen Lebens zwischen 1870 und 1920. Herrsching am Ammersee 2006, p. 153.
Allgemeines Künstlerlexikon, Band 32. K. G. Saur Verlag, München 2002, p. 432.
 F. H. Ehmcke und seine Neusser Schüler H. Cossmann, E. Malzburg, J. Urbach. Katalog Clemens-Sels-Museum Neuss, 1984.

German typographers and type designers
German illustrators
1878 births
1965 deaths